Gandyab may refer to:
 Gandyab-e Bala
 Gandyab-e Pain